Shabbir is a given name. Notable people with the name include:

Shabbir Ahluwalia (born 1979), Indian television actor
Ahmed Shakeel Shabbir Ahmed (born 1953), Kenyan politician
Shabbir Ahmad Usmani (1886–1949), eminent Islamic scholar; provided Pakistan with an Islamic system of governance
Shabbir Ahmed (born 1976), Pakistani cricketer
Shabbir Banoobhai (born 1949), South African poet
Shabbir Khan (born 1978), Bangladeshi cricketer who plays first-class cricket for Chittagong Division
Shabbir Kumar (born 1954), Indian playback singer
Shabbir Masani, Indian actor who became famous for playing the role of "Yeda" in Satya (1998)
Shabbir Sharif (1943–1971), Pakistani Major killed in action
Tariq Shabbir Khan Mayo, member of National Assembly of Pakistan

See also
Shabbir syndrome (aka "Laryngo–onycho–cutaneous syndrome"), a cutaneous condition inherited in an autosomal recessive fashion
Husayn ibn Ali, also known by the sobriquet "Shabbir"